Sean Andrews (born 20 January 1978) is a South African cricketer. He played in three first-class and three List A matches from 1999/00 to 2002/03.

References

External links
 

1978 births
Living people
South African cricketers
Eastern Province cricketers
Gauteng cricketers
Cricketers from Cape Town